Fergal Ua Ruairc (died 967) was King of Connacht, Ireland. The annals state that, in 961, he won the battle of Catinchi.

References

 Leabhar na nGenealach, Dublin, 2004-2005
 Annals of the Four Masters, ed. John O'Donovan, Dublin, 1856
 Annals of Lough Ce, ed. W.M. Hennessey, London, 1871.
 Irish Kings and High Kings, Francis John Byrne, 3rd revised edition, Dublin: Four Courts Press, 2001. 
 "Ua Ruairc", in Seán Duffy (ed.), Medieval Ireland: An Encyclopedia. Routledge. 2005. pp. 

967 deaths
People from County Leitrim
People from County Cavan
10th-century kings of Connacht
Year of birth unknown